Aleksander Lensman (also Aleksander Lensmann or Aleksander Leitmäe; 1890 Järvakandi Parish (now Kehtna Parish), Harrien County – ?) was an Estonian politician. He was a member of II Riigikogu. He was a member of the Riigikogu since 29 April 1925. He replaced Jüri Kurul. On 7 October 1925, he resigned his position and he was replaced by Martin Kruusemann.

References

1890 births
Year of death missing
People from Kehtna Parish
People from Kreis Harrien
Farmers' Assemblies politicians
Members of the Riigikogu, 1923–1926